Battlefield – The Rocktopia Records Collection is the fifth compilation album released by the melodic hard rock band Ten, which consists of tracks from all the Rocktopia Records releases, namely Albion, Isla De Muerta and The Dragon And Saint George EP.

As with the last three releases, the collection's cover was illustrated by Gaetano Di Falco, who also illustrated the band's three aforementioned releases.
The release was strictly limited to 500 copies.

Track listing
All songs written by Gary Hughes except where noted.

Disc One - Albion
All songs written by Gary Hughes.
 Alone In The Dark Tonight - 4:25
 Battlefield - 5:00
 It's Alive - 5:02
 Albion Born - 5:24
 Sometimes Love Takes The Long Way Home - 5:14
 A Smuggler's Tale - 5:57
 It Ends This Day - 5:37
 Die For Me - 7:28
 Gioco D'Amore - 4:59
 Wild Horses - 5:55
 Good God In Heaven What Hell Is This - 4:00 (Japanese Version Bonus Track)
 The Prodigal Saviour – 4:12 (Exclusive The Dragon And Saint George EP Track)
 Is There Anyone With Sense – 5:15 (Exclusive The Dragon And Saint George EP Track)

Disc Two - Isla De Muerta
 (i) Buccaneers (Instrumental) / (ii) Dead Men Tell No Tales - 6:27
 Tell Me What To Do - 4:15
 Acquiesce - 4:45
 This Love - 4:42
 The Dragon And Saint George - 5:16
 Intensify - 6:39
 (i) Karnak (Instrumental) / (ii) The Valley Of The Kings - 8:10
 Revolution - 5:56
 Musketeers: Soldiers Of The King – 4:07 (Exclusive The Dragon And Saint George EP Track)
 Angel Of Darkness - 3:57
 The Last Pretender - 6:40
 We Can Be As One – 3:28
 Assault And Battery - 4:52 (Japanese Version Bonus Track)

Personnel
Gary Hughes – vocals, guitars, backing vocals
 Dann Rosingana – lead guitars
 Steve Grocott - lead guitars
John Halliwell – rhythm Guitars
Darrel Treece-Birch – keyboards, programming
Steve Mckenna – bass guitar
 Max Yates – drums and percussion

Production
Produced by Gary Hughes
Mixing and mastering by Dennis Ward

References

Ten (band) albums
2016 compilation albums